Església de Sant Miquel de Prats  is a church located in Prats, Canillo Parish, Andorra. It is a heritage property registered in the Cultural Heritage of Andorra. It was built in the 12th-13th century.

References

Canillo
Roman Catholic churches in Andorra
Cultural Heritage of Andorra